Pesotum is a village in Champaign County, Illinois, United States. The population was 551 at the 2010 census.

The village was named after Pesotum, a Native American warrior in the Battle of Fort Dearborn.

Geography

Demographics
As of the 2020 census there were 550 people, 193 households, and 120 families residing in the village. The racial makeup of the village was 96.73% White, 0.73% African American, 0.18% from other races, and 2.36% from two or more races. Hispanic or Latino of any race were 1.64% of the population.

There were 193 households, out of which 31.61% had children under the age of 18 living with them, 48.19% were married couples living together, 5.18% had a female householder with no husband present, and 37.82% were non-families. 32.12% of all households were made up of individuals, and 13.47% had someone living alone who was 65 years of age or older. The average household size was 2.91 and the average family size was 2.32.

The village's age distribution consisted of 16.3% under the age of 18, 7.6% from 18 to 24, 22.1% from 25 to 44, 39.9% from 45 to 64, and 14.1% who were 65 years of age or older. The median age was 47.1 years. For every 100 females, there were 96.1 males. For every 100 females age 18 and over, there were 95.8 males.

The median income for a household in the village was $76,339, and the median income for a family was $87,917. Males had a median income of $44,875 versus $40,000 for females. The per capita income for the village was $33,158. About 8.3% of families and 8.0% of the population were below the poverty line, including 3.1% of those under age 18 and 6.3% of those age 65 or over.

References

External links

 Early history of Pesotum, Illinois

Villages in Champaign County, Illinois
Villages in Illinois